The white-tailed flycatcher (Leucoptilon concretum) is a species of bird in the family Muscicapidae. It is the only member of the monotypic genus Leucoptilon. Prior to 2022, it was classified in the genus Cyornis, but was reclassified into Leucoptilon by the International Ornithological Congress based on a 2021 phylogenetic study.

It is found in Brunei, China, India, Indonesia, Laos, Malaysia, Myanmar, Thailand, and Vietnam.
Its natural habitats are subtropical or tropical moist lowland forests and subtropical or tropical moist montane forests.

References

Muscicapidae
Birds of Southeast Asia
white-tailed flycatcher
Taxonomy articles created by Polbot